Sir Jeremy Sambrooke, 4th Baronet  (c. 1703–1740) of Bush Hill, Enfield, Middlesex, was a British landowner and Tory politician who sat in the House of Commons from 1731 to 1740.

Early life
Sambrooke was the only son of Sir Samuel Sambrooke, 3rd Baronet, MP for Bramber and Great Bedwyn, and the former Elizabeth Wright. Among his sisters were Jane Elizabeth Sambrooke (wife of Charles Wake-Jones and Sir Humphrey Monoux, 4th Baronet), and Susannah Sambrooke (wife of John Crawley, MP for Marlborough).

His maternal grandfather was Sir Nathan Wright of Caldecote, Warwickshire, Lord Keeper of the Great Seal under King William III and Queen Anne. His maternal aunt, Dorothy Wright, was the wife of Henry Grey, 3rd Earl of Stamford. His paternal grandfather was Sir Jeremy Sambrooke of Bush Hill, a director of the East India Company.

After attending the school of  Dr. Uvedale at Enfield, Sambrooke was admitted at Inner Temple probably in 1716 and at Trinity College, Cambridge on 7 July 1720, aged 17, where he was awarded  MA in 1722.

Career
Having acquired considerable estates in the north of Bedfordshire from 1719, Sambrooke stood as a Tory at several by-elections, but was unsuccessful at Queenborough in February 1728, Wendover in March 1728, and Queenborough  again in January 1729. However, he was returned as Member of Parliament for Bedford at a by-election on 30 January 1731, with the support of Wriothesley Russell, 3rd Duke of Bedford and by spending lavishly. He was returned unopposed at the 1734 British general election, and voted against the Administration in all recorded divisions.

Baronetage
He succeeded his father to the baronetcy on 27 December 1714. His father had succeeded to the baronetcy under special remainder on the death of his maternal uncle Sir John Vanacker, 2nd Baronet.

Personal life
Sambrooke died unmarried on 5 July 1740. He was succeeded in the baronetcy by his uncle, Jeremy Sambrooke, the fifth and last baronet.

References

1700s births
1740 deaths
British MPs 1727–1734
British MPs 1734–1741
Members of the Parliament of Great Britain for English constituencies
Baronets in the Baronetage of England